Puerto Gaitán is a town and municipality in the Meta Department, Colombia.

History 
Puerto Gaitán was founded on February 11, 1932, when Venezuelan merchants: Pedro Capella, Ventura Alvarado and Concepción Izanoboco arrived on the banks of the Manacacías River and settled there before the announcement of the provision of a ferry or ferryboat from the Manacacías River to achieve transit between Puerto Carreño and Villavicencio.

In this first point there was quite a lot of “majaguillo” tree, which gave it the name of majaguillal, until 1960 when it was elevated to the category of Police Inspection of the municipality of Puerto López and was called Manacacías.

On November 29, 1969, the Departmental Assembly of Meta erected this population as a municipality with the name of Puerto Gaitán, in honor of the liberal leader Jorge Eliécer Gaitán.

Geography

Location 
Pto Gaitan is a municipality located in the department of Meta. It includes an extensive area of flat structure known as the Savannahs of the Altillanura, whose main articulating axis is the Meta River.

The Municipality is an irregular rectangle circumscribed by the Meta River to the north, the Manacacias River and the Yucao River to the west, the Iteviare River to the south and a straight line to the East. It forms the extreme north-east of the Department of Meta, being the most distant Municipality from the departmental capital city Villavicencio.

Hydrography 
Rivers Manacacias, Meta, Yucao, Planas, Muco, Guarrojo, Tillaba, Uva and I take.

PIPES: The springboard, Chavilonia, Vergel, Piriri, Yopo, Pilón, Melúa, Casibiare, Danta, La Plata, Bateas.

Climate 
In Puerto Gaitán, the summers are short, warm, and cloudy; the winters are hot, wet, and mostly cloudy; and it is oppressive year round. During the course of the year, the temperature generally ranges from 22 °C to 34 °C, rarely falling below 20 °C or rising above 37 °C.

Based on the beach/pool score, the best times of year to visit Puerto Gaitán for hot activities are mid June to mid October and early December to early February.

Political and administrative structure

Territorial organization 
The municipality is made up of the neighborhoods of the municipal seat and the inspections of San Pedro de Arimena, Puente Arimena, San Miguel, El Porvenir, Tillaba, Puerto Trujillo, Planas, Rubiales, La Cristalina and Murujuy.

Economy 
The economic activities of the municipality are basically subscribed to livestock, medium-scale agriculture, trade and fishing is incipient and artisanal industry as well. You can consult more in documents of the municipality. ECONOMIC TRENDS IN PUERTO GAITÁN Livestock occupies the first line in the Municipality in the economic sector. In Agriculture, corn, banana, cassava and African palm crops stand out. The practice of fishing also represents a very good source of income and in tourism two events of National and International category are held, such as the Summer Festival and the Cachama Festival, currently the Oil Field

Rubiales is the largest generator of resources for this Municipality, being approximately 90% of the annual budget, but it is a non-renewable resource.

Infrastructure and urban equipment

References 

Municipalities of Meta Department